Display Control Channel (DCC) is an advanced method of implementing an on-screen display (OSD) technology on KVM switches.

On-screen display technology used on KVM switches is used to show control and selection functions pertaining to the KVM, such as what port is selected, and what ports have computers connected.  OSD is typically broadcast on top of the selected channel's existing display.  Because of this, the quality of the OSD's images is inconsistent and unreliable.  Its size and positioning depend on the video resolution of each individual system connected.

On KVMs with a DCC controlling menu, the configuration selection is displayed on a dedicated independent video channel.  The quality of the controlling menu is more secure and reliable because of this.  The DCC method of broadcasting this information via an independent channel allows for greater functionality and more programming possibilities in the future.

Display Control Channel is patented by Connectpro.

See also
Display Data Channel

External links

Computer peripherals
Out-of-band management